The Cheetah Girls was an American girl group formed in 2003, consisting of Adrienne Bailon, Kiely Williams and Sabrina Bryan as full members, and plus Raven-Symoné as a member only on soundtrack albums. The group was created by Disney, and was made famous by the eponymous Disney Channel original film and its sequels, The Cheetah Girls 2 and The Cheetah Girls: One World. The group has released three studio albums, Cheetah-licious Christmas, In Concert: The Party's Just Begun Tour, and TCG plus several RIAA certified Platinum albums including, The Cheetah Girls, The Cheetah Girls 2, and The Cheetah Girls: One World. All of their albums and soundtracks reached the Billboard 200. The soundtrack to their first film sold over 2 million copies.

The group has launched a clothing line, several perfume collections, doll lines, room decor, a book series and video games. The group has had three nationwide tours, Cheetah-licious Christmas Tour, The Party's Just Begun Tour and One World Tour. The Cheetah Girls grossed over US$43 million from their second tour. They have sold over 11 million records worldwide.

Career

2002–2005: First movie and Cheetah-licious Christmas

The Cheetah Girls had a television movie, based on a best-selling series of young adult books of the same name by Deborah Gregory, which was filmed in October and November 2002, and debuted on August 15, 2003. The movie's DVD sold over 800,000 copies and the film received over 84 million viewers worldwide. The film starred Raven-Symoné, Sabrina Byran, Adrienne Bailon and Kiely Williams. During casting auditions for the film, the singer Solange Knowles was originally cast, but pulled out of the film due to the promotion and release of her debut album Solo Star. The role was then given to Williams, who along with Bailon was originally in the girl group 3LW. Though there had been no contractual plans to record as an actual music group, producer Debra Martin Chase was able to convince Disney to create new contracts and release the film's music as a soundtrack. The CD was a surprise success despite not having been promoted. Soon after the first soundtrack, plans were underway to turn the Cheetah Girls into a real-life recording group. Symoné however, decided to focus on solo work, leaving the trio of just Bailon, Bryan and Williams.

The Cheetah Girls was also supposed to be adapted into a primetime TV series for ABC in their 2004–2005 season. According to an article on the MTV news site, ABC was set to put the show into production in early 2004, with discussions also being held to write a role for fellow 3LW member, Jessica Benson. A later article, published in February 2004, states that The Cheetah Girls sitcom was delayed due to the success of That's So Raven. The article stated that because of this success, Raven would not be able to do the sitcom. ABC did not pick up the series. A pilot for the show was rumored to have been filmed, but the long-standing rumors about the pilot being filmed were later debunked by Williams and Bryan.

In late 2004, the girls recorded for the first time as a trio and recording act for the Disneymania 3 album, remaking the song "I Won't Say (I'm in Love)" from the Hercules soundtrack. The girls released their first record in October 2005 under Walt Disney Records, Cheetah-licious Christmas. The holiday album included classic Christmas songs as well as several original songs, one of which was co-written by all three girls. The album peaked at number 74 on the Billboard 200 albums chart. Its lead single, "Cheetah-licious Christmas", was rotated on Radio Disney and a music video for the song was shown on Disney Channel. A second single from the album, "Five More Days 'Til Christmas" was released as a promo single exclusively on Radio Disney. The following month, the girls went on tour to support the album, along with Aly & AJ as the opening act for the Jonas Brothers as special guests.

2006–2007: Second movie, TCG and tour
The Cheetah Girls began work on their debut album in January 2006. "We'll be making a real album, not a soundtrack," Adrienne Bailon says. "Some of the music on there will be produced by will.i.am from The Black Eyed Peas," she says. "It's important for people to see us as a real musical group. We have all this great marketing around us, with the movies and other things. But we are a musical group." However, when filming and recording for The Cheetah Girls 2 came up, the album was put on hold. Raven-Symoné returned for the film, which was shot on location in Barcelona, Spain in the spring of 2006.

The Cheetah Girls 2 premiere received a total of over 8.1 million viewers, making it the highest rated premiere for a Disney Channel Original Movie at the time. Following the film's premiere, the group embarked on The Party's Just Begun Tour from September 2006 to March 2007. They also performed at the Disney Channel Games on April 24, 2007.

In an interview with Billboard about the postponed album, Sabrina Bryan stated that the girls worked on writing for the album during their tour, and that they hoped to gather an audience of older fans while simultaneously staying true to their younger fan base. Bryan also stated that the girls would work with producers they had worked with in the past as well as exploring new producers, such as Timbaland. The album was originally titled Who We Are, and set to be released on June 19, 2007 but this was postponed to September 25, 2007, with a release name of TCG. The track "So Bring It On" was released as the album's first single. "Fuego" was released as the second single from the album.

2007–2008: Third movie and disbandment

The third Cheetah Girls film was announced for pre-production in early 2007, with Adrienne Bailon revealing in March 2007 that the film would be filming for a three-month period, in India and that the film would have a storyline and theme centered around Bollywood. The entirety of the main cast members was invited to return, but Raven-Symoné confirmed in August 2007 that she would not appear in the third film.

Although "catfights" and "territorial issues" were initially stated to be the reason, Symoné revealed that she did not appear in the third film due to feeling "excluded" and "ostracized" on the set of the second film, likely due to the fact that the three other girls had spent so much time together after being put together in the real-life Cheetah Girls recording group. It was also revealed that Raven and Williams didn't get along because of jealousy of Raven's role on The Cosby Show and Raven revealed she would've went to jail if it wasn't for Lynn Whitfield, who played her mom, keeping her tame during filming.

The group began filming their third and final Cheetah Girls movie, entitled The Cheetah Girls: One World, in January 2008. It premiered on August 22, 2008 with its soundtrack released on August 19. The movie debuted with 6.2 million viewers, the lowest-ever rated premiere for the series. In the fall of 2008, the group went on tour to support the One World movie and soundtrack, which would be their last tour together. In late December 2008, the group disbanded.

Legacy 
The Cheetah Girls were the first multi-ethnic girl music group to come out of the Disney Channel. The group not only featured young women of various races, backgrounds, and sizes, but it also showcased music from various cultures around the world. When the second movie took the group to Spain, they released “Amigas Cheetahs” and “Fuego” that featured Spanish lyrics and utilized costumes that are typical of Spanish culture.

The group was largely popular at the same time as a more “grown up” multi-ethnic girl group, The Pussycat Dolls. This parallel is visible in their names, in their upbeat dance tracks, and even in their choreography. The largest difference is in the PG nature of The Cheetah Girls, they keep their choreography rather clean and they are always in layers that are not very revealing. This all helped the group gain popularity with tweens and parents alike.

The message in The Cheetah Girls films is that stardom is attainable as long as you remember that your close personal relationships are more important. The group staying together was always the main goal of the series. This female support shown in the movies communicated an idea of feminism to young girls watching. The music of the group speaks about “friends for life” and “sisters, we stand together” which gave young girls a foundation in feminism and an appreciation for other ethnicities.

The Cheetah Girls have inspired many artists that came after them. Popular celebrities such as Fifth Harmony (mainly Camila Cabello and Ally Brooke), The McClain Sisters, Zendaya, Olivia Holt and Brittany O'Grady have mentioned The Cheetah Girls as idols or an inspiration. Kehlani and rapper Cardi B have also paid homage to The Cheetah Girls by singing their songs.

Filmography

Discography

Albums
 Cheetah-licious Christmas (2005)
 TCG (2007)

Soundtracks
 The Cheetah Girls (2003)
 The Cheetah Girls 2 (2006)
 The Cheetah Girls: One World (2008)

Merchandise
There are Cheetah Girls-based clothing lines, toys, and video games. The clothing line was made available in Sears stores, and its launch was the most successful in Sears history.

Videos games have been produced for GBA and Nintendo DS, as well as a dancemat game. Toy instruments have been produced for the children's market.

The Cheetah Girls also have a doll line, released in 2007, inspired by the Disney Channel Original Movies (DCOMs). There are several versions of the dolls and the three members. The dolls were sold at Sears stores nationwide and several other retailers.

Miscellaneous

Book series

The Cheetah Girls started as a book series that was written by Deborah Gregory. There are two versions of the Cheetah Girls book series. The original, which was the inspiration for the first movie, and the other by Disney authors released as movie tie-ins.

DVDs
The Disney Channel Original Movies, and the concert DVD, are released with The Cheetah Girls 2 Special Edition Soundtrack. A 20-minute highlights DVD of the Girls' The Party's Just Begun Tour was released on July 10, 2007, along with a live audio CD of the tour. The first DVD released has sold over 800,000 copies. The Cheetah Girls have also released a California Adventures DVD and two compilation DVDs, DisneyMania 3 in Concert and Radio Disney's Totally 15th Birthday.

Toothbrushes
In 2006, Tooth Tunes released a toothbrush featuring a picture of The Cheetah Girls and plays a clip of their single "Shake a Tail Feather". It was one of the most popular toothbrushes for all girls in 2006.

Tours

Cheetah-licious Christmas Tour (2005)
The Party's Just Begun Tour (2006–2007)
The One World Tour (2008)

References

External links

The Cheetah Girls on MySpace

The Cheetah Girls
American dance music groups
American girl groups
American contemporary R&B musical groups
American pop girl groups
American pop music groups
Raven-Symoné
Hollywood Records artists
Musical groups established in 2003
Musical groups disestablished in 2008
American musical trios
Walt Disney Records artists